Brothers Osborne is the first EP from American country music duo Brothers Osborne. As their first commercial release, the work was released on September 9, 2014, and published through EMI Records Nashville.  The EP includes a demo of "Stay a Little Longer", co-written by Shane McAnally and first featured on this EP, but re-recorded with Jay Joyce for the single release.

Touring 
The duo toured with Eric Church on his Outsiders Tour.

Critical reception 
Steve Gazibara of Whiskey Riff states that the "sound, the vibe, and the lyrics are a breath of fresh air", going on to say that "'Love The Lonely Out of You' is a groovy and bluesy tune, the perfect compliment to the other four songs, especially the rocking and gritty 'Shoot from the Hip'".

Track listing

Chart history

References 

2014 EPs
Brothers Osborne albums
EMI Records EPs